Dedina Mládeže is a village and municipality in Slovakia with a population of 514.

Geography 
River Váh is located north from the town, and near the river, there is a natural area, with beautiful forests. This area has a fauna and flora, which is typical for meadow forests. In the centre of the village there are monumental buildings : the school and the town hall. One can do water sports here too.

History 
In the 9th century, the territory of Dedina Mládeže became part of the Kingdom of Hungary. After the Austro-Hungarian army disintegrated in November 1918, Czechoslovak troops occupied the area, later acknowledged internationally by the Treaty of Trianon. Between 1938 and 1945 territory of Dedina Mládeže once more  became part of Miklós Horthy's Hungary through the First Vienna Award. From 1945 until the Velvet Divorce, it was part of Czechoslovakia. Since then it has been part of Slovakia.

The village was founded by youth volunteers building the Trať Mládeže in 1949 as a settlement within Kolárovo. In 1954, it became an independent settlement, which however also included parts of the villages Komoča, Neded and Zemné.

Accommodation 
There are many typical rustic houses where one can stay for night.

Transport 

 car : the village is located near the road from Kolárovo to Šaľa, and it is only  from Kolárovo
 bus : Dedina Mládeže has a bus connection with Kolárovo and Šaľa
 there was a plan to build a railway connection from Kolárovo to Neded across Dedina Mládeže, but it's still not complete

References

External links 

Villages and municipalities in the Komárno District
Hungarian communities in Slovakia